Philosophy of law is a branch of philosophy that examines the nature of law and law's relationship to other systems of norms, especially ethics and political philosophy. It asks questions like "What is law?", "What are the criteria for legal validity?", and "What is the relationship between law and morality?" Philosophy of law and jurisprudence are often used interchangeably, though jurisprudence sometimes encompasses forms of reasoning that fit into economics or sociology.

Philosophy of law can be sub-divided into analytical jurisprudence, and normative jurisprudence. Analytical jurisprudence aims to define what law is and what it is not by identifying law's essential features. Normative jurisprudence investigates both the non-legal norms that shape law and the legal norms that are generated by law and guide human action.

Analytical jurisprudence
Unlike experimental jurisprudence, which investigates the content of legal concepts using the methods of social science, analytical jurisprudence seeks to provide a general account of the nature of law through the tools of conceptual analysis. The account is general in the sense of targeting universal features of law that hold at all times and places. Whereas lawyers are interested in what the law is on a specific issue in a specific jurisdiction, philosophers of law are interested in identifying the features of law shared across cultures, times, and places. Taken together, these foundational features of law offer the kind of universal definition philosophers are  after. The general approach allows philosophers to ask questions about, for example, what separates law from morality, politics, or practical reason. Often, scholars in the field presume that law has a unique set of features that separate it from other phenomena, though not all share the presumption.

While the field has traditionally focused on giving an account of law's nature, some scholars have begun to examine the nature of domains within law, e.g. tort law, contract law, or criminal law. These scholars focus on what makes certain domains of law distinctive and how one domain differs from another. A particularly fecund area of research has been the distinction between tort law and criminal law, which more generally bears on the difference between civil and criminal law.

Several schools of thought have developed around the nature of law, the most influential of which are:

Natural moral law theory, which asserts that law is inherent in nature and constitutive of morality, at least in part. On this view, while legislators can enact and even successfully enforce immoral laws, such laws are legally invalid. The view is captured by the maxim: an unjust law is not a true law, where 'unjust' means 'contrary to the natural law.' Natural law theory has medieval origins in the philosophy of Thomas Aquinas, especially in his Treatise on law. In late 20th century, John Finnis revived interest in the theory and provided a modern reworking of it.
Legal positivism, which is the view that law depends primarily on social facts. Legal positivism has traditionally been associated with three doctrines: the pedigree thesis, the separability thesis, and the discretion thesis. The pedigree thesis says that the right way to determine whether a directive is law is to look at the directive's source. The thesis claims that it is the fact that the directive was issued by the proper official within a legitimate government, for example, that determines the directive's legal validity—not the directive's moral or practical merits. The separability thesis states that law is conceptually distinct from morality. While law might contain morality, the separability thesis states that "it is in no sense a necessary truth that laws reproduce or satisfy certain demands of morality, though in fact they have often done so." Legal positivists disagree about the extent of the separability thesis. Exclusive legal positivists, notably Joseph Raz, go further than the standard thesis and deny that it is possible for morality to be a part of law at all. The discretion thesis states that judges create new law when they are given discretion to adjudicate cases where existing law underdetermines the result. The earliest proponent of legal positivism was John Austin who was influenced by the writings of Jeremy Bentham in the early 19th century. Austin held that the law is the command of the sovereign backed by the threat of punishment. Contemporary legal positivism has long abandoned this view. In the twentieth century, two positivists had a profound influence on the field: Hans Kelsen and H. L. A. Hart. Kelsen is most influential for his notion of 'grundnorm,' an ultimate and basic legal norm, which some scholars, especially in Europe, accept today. In the Anglophone world, Hart has been the most influential scholar. Hart rejected the earlier claim that sanctions are essential to law and instead argued that law is  rule-based. According to Hart, law is a system of primary rules that guide the conduct of law's subjects, and secondary rules that regulate how the primary rules may be changed, identified, and adjudicated. Hart's theory, although widely admired, sparked vigorous debate among late twentieth century philosophers of law including Ronald Dworkin, John Rawls, Joseph Raz, and John Finnis.
Legal realism, which asserts that law is the product of decisions made by courts, law enforcement, and attorneys, which are often decided on contradictory or arbitrary grounds. According to legal realism, law is not a rational system of rules and norms. Legal realism is critical of the idea that law has a nature that can be analyzed in the abstract. Instead, legal realists advocate an empirical approach to jurisprudence founded in social sciences and the actual practice of law in the world. For this reason, legal realism has often been associated with the sociology of law. In the United States, legal realism gained prominence in the late 19th century with Oliver Wendell Holmes and John Chipman Grey. Legal realism became influential in Scandinavia in the 20th century with Axel Hägerström.
Legal interpretivism, which denies that law is source-based because law necessarily depends on human interpretation that is guided by the moral norms of communities. Given that judges have discretion to adjudicate cases in more than one way, legal interpretivism says that judges characteristically adjudicate in the way that best preserves the moral norms, institutional facts, and social practices of the societies in which they are a part. It is consistent with legal interpretivism that one cannot know whether a society has a legal system in force, or what any of its laws are, until one knows some moral truths about the justifications for the practices in that society. In contrast with legal positivism or legal realism, it is possible for the legal interpretivist to claim that no one in a society knows what its laws are (because no one may know the best justification of its practices.) Legal interpretivism originated with Ronald Dworkin in the late 20th century in his book Law's Empire.

In recent years, debates about the nature of law have become increasingly fine-grained. One important debate exists within legal positivism about the separability of law and morality. Exclusive legal positivists claim that the legal validity of a norm never depends on its moral correctness. Inclusive legal positivists claim that moral considerations may determine the legal validity of a norm, but that it is not necessary that this is the case. Positivism began as an inclusivist theory; but influential exclusive legal positivists, including Joseph Raz, John Gardner, and Leslie Green, later rejected the idea.

A second important debate, often called the "Hart–Dworkin debate", concerns the battle between the two most dominant schools in the late 20th and early 21st century, legal interpretivism and legal positivism.

Normative jurisprudence
In addition to analytic jurisprudence, legal philosophy is also concerned with normative theories of law.  "Normative jurisprudence involves normative, evaluative, and otherwise prescriptive questions about the law." For example, What is the goal or purpose of law?  What moral or political theories provide a foundation for the law?  Three approaches have been influential in contemporary moral and political philosophy, and these approaches are reflected in normative theories of law:
 Utilitarianism is the view that laws should be crafted so as to produce the best consequences.  Historically, utilitarian thought regarding law is associated with the philosopher Jeremy Bentham.  In contemporary legal theory, the utilitarian approach is frequently championed by scholars who work in the law and economics tradition.
 Deontology is the view that laws should reflect our obligation to preserve the autonomy and rights of others.  Historically, deontological thought regarding law is associated with Immanuel Kant, who formulated one particularly prominent deontological theory of law.  Another deontological approach can be found in the work of contemporary legal philosopher Ronald Dworkin.
 Aretaic moral theories such as contemporary virtue ethics emphasize the role of character in morality.  Virtue jurisprudence is the view that the laws should promote the development of virtuous characters by citizens.  Historically, this approach is associated with Aristotle.  Contemporary virtue jurisprudence is inspired by philosophical work on virtue ethics.
There are many other normative approaches to the philosophy of law, including critical legal studies and libertarian theories of law.

Philosophical approaches to legal problems

Philosophers of law are also concerned with a variety of philosophical problems that arise in particular legal subjects, such as constitutional law, Contract law, Criminal law, and Tort law. Thus, philosophy of law addresses such diverse topics as theories of contract law, theories of criminal punishment, theories of tort liability, and the question of whether judicial review is justified.

Notable philosophers of law

Plato
Aristotle
Thomas Aquinas
Hadley Arkes
Francis Bacon
John Locke
Francisco Suarez
Francisco de Vitoria
Hugo Grotius
John Austin (legal philosophy)
Frederic Bastiat
Evgeny Pashukanis
Jeremy Bentham
Emilio Betti
Norberto Bobbio
António Castanheira Neves
Jules Coleman
Ronald Dworkin
Francesco D'Agostino
Francisco Elías de Tejada y Spínola
Carlos Cossio
Miguel Reale
John Finnis
Lon L. Fuller
Leslie Green
Robert P. George
Germain Grisez
H. L. A. Hart
Georg Wilhelm Friedrich Hegel
Oliver Wendell Holmes, Jr.
Alf Ross
Tony Honoré
Rudolf Jhering
Johann Gottlieb Fichte
Hans Kelsen
Joel Feinberg
David Lyons
Robert Alexy
Reinhold Zippelius
Neil MacCormick
William E. May
Martha Nussbaum
Gustav Radbruch
Joseph Raz
Jeremy Waldron
Friedrich Carl von Savigny
Robert Summers
Roberto Unger
Catharine MacKinnon
John Rawls
Pierre Schlag
Robin West
Carl Schmitt
Jürgen Habermas
Carlos Santiago Nino
Geoffrey Warnock
Scott J. Shapiro
Shen Buhai
Shang Yang
Han Fei
Zhu Xi

See also

Legal maxim
Critical legal studies
Critical rationalism
Constitutional economics
Experimental jurisprudence
Indeterminacy debate in legal theory
Judicial activism
Jurisprudence
Justice
Law
Law and economics
Law and literature
Legal formalism
Interpretivism (legal)
Legal positivism
Legal realism
Libertarian theories of law
Natural law
Philosophy, theology, and fundamental theory of Catholic canon law
Rule of law
Rule according to higher law
Virtue jurisprudence
Mens rea
Actus reus

References

Further reading 
 Plato, Minos (many editions).
 Plato, Laws (many editions).

 Thomas Aquinas, Summa Contra Gentiles (many editions).
 Hadley Arkes, First Things (Princeton, New Jersey: Princeton University Press, 1986).
 Ronald Dworkin, Taking Rights Seriously (Cambridge, Massachusetts: Harvard University Press, 1977).
 Ronald Dworkin, A Matter of Principle (Cambridge, Massachusetts: Harvard University Press, 1986).
 Ronald Dworkin, Law's Empire (Cambridge, Massachusetts: Harvard University Press, 1986).
 Ronald Dworkin, Freedom's Law: The Moral Reading of the American Constitution (Cambridge, Massachusetts: Harvard University Press, 1997).
 Lon L. Fuller, The Morality of Law (New Haven, CT: Yale University Press, 1965).
 John Chipman Gray, The Nature and Sources of Law (Peter Smith, 1972, reprint).
 H. L. A. Hart, The Concept of Law (Oxford: Oxford University Press, 1961).
 H. L. A. Hart, Punishment and Responsibility (Oxford: Oxford University Press, 1968).
 Sterling Harwood, Judicial Activism: A Restrained Defense (London: Austin & Winfield Publishers, 1996).
 Georg Wilhelm Friedrich Hegel, Philosophy of Right (Oxford University Press 1967)
 Ian Farrell & Morten Ebbe Juul Nielsen, Legal Philosophy: 5 Questions, New York: Automatic Press, April 2007
 Oliver Wendell Holmes, Jr., The Common Law (Dover, 1991, reprint).
 Immanuel Kant, Metaphysics of Morals (Doctrine of Right) (Cambridge University Press 2000, reprint).
 Hans Kelsen, Pure Theory of Law (Lawbook Exchange Ltd., 2005, reprint).
 Catharine MacKinnon, Toward a Feminist Theory of the State. (Cambridge: Harvard University Press, 1989).
 Duncan Kennedy, A Critique of Adjudication (Cambridge, Massachusetts: Harvard University Press, 1998).
 David Lyons, Ethics & The Rule of Law (Cambridge: Cambridge University Press, 1984).
 David Lyons, Moral Aspects of Legal Theory (Cambridge: Cambridge University Press, 1993).
 Neil MacCormick, Legal Reasoning and Legal Theory (Oxford: Oxford University Press, 1979).
 Joseph Raz, The Authority of Law (Oxford: Oxford University Press, 1983, reprint).
 Robert S. Summers, Instrumentalism and American Legal Theory (Ithaca, NY: Cornell University Press, 1982).
 Robert S. Summers, Lon Fuller (Stanford, CA: Stanford University Press, 1984).
 Roberto Mangabeira Unger, The Critical Legal Studies Movement (Cambridge, Massachusetts: Harvard University Press, 1986).
 Jeffrie G. Murphy and Jules L. Coleman, The Philosophy of Law: An Introduction to Jurisprudence'' (Boulder, CO: Westview Press, 1989).

External links

Internet Encyclopedia of Philosophy: Philosophy of Law

 
Legal ethics
Social philosophy
Law